The Chigi codex is a music manuscript originating in Flanders. According to Herbert Kellman, it was created sometime between 1498 and 1503, probably at the behest of Philip I of Castile. It is currently housed in the Vatican Library under the call number Chigiana, C. VIII. 234.

The Chigi codex is notable not only for its vivid and colorful illuminations, which were probably done in Ghent in the workshop of the Master of the Hortulus Animae, but also for its very clear and legible musical notation. It contains a nearly complete catalogue of the polyphonic masses by Johannes Ockeghem and a collection of five relatively early L'homme armé mass settings, including Ockeghem's.

Several folia, comprising eight works, were added to the original codex at some point after the manuscript's original creation. These are indicated as such in the list below.

The two coats of arms in the page from Missa Ecce ancilla Domini refer to the Fernández de Córdoba family.

A facsimile of the Chigi Codex in seven parts is available to view online, in the International Music Scores Library Project, or IMSLP. The Petrucci Music Library/IMSLP is run by Project Petrucci LLC in the U.S.A.

Contents
The manuscript contains the following works (this list is distilled from that found in Kellman's article):

Alexander Agricola
Missa In myne zyn (without Kyrie)
Antoine Brumel
Missa L'homme armé
Antoine Busnois
Missa L'homme armé
Antoine de Févin
Sancta Trinitas unus Deus (addition)
Gaspar van Weerbeke
Stabat mater
Heinrich Isaac
Angeli archangeli
Jacobus Barbireau
Missa Virgo parens Christi (without Agnus Dei)
Jean Mouton
Quis dabit oculis (addition; no attribution)
Johannes Ockeghem
Ave Maria (addition)
Intemerata Dei Mater
Missa Mi-mi
Missa Ecce ancilla Domini
Missa L'homme armé
Missa Fors seulement (Kyrie, Gloria and Credo only)
Missa sine nomine (Kyrie, Gloria and Credo only)
Missa Ma maistresse (Kyrie and Gloria)
Missa Caput
Missa De plus en plus
Missa Au travail suis
Missa cuiusvis toni
Missa Prolationum
Missa quinti toni
Missa pro defunctis
Johannes Regis
Celsi tonantis
Clangat plebs
Lauda Sion Salvatorem
Lux solempnis (no attribution)
O admirabile commercium
Josquin des Prez
Missa L'homme armé sexti toni (Kyrie, Gloria and Credo only)
Stabat mater
Loyset Compère
Ave Maria (addition)
Missa L'homme armé
Sancte Michael ora pro nobis (addition; no attribution)
Sile frago ac rerum (no attribution)
Pierre de la Rue
Credo Sine nomine
Missa Almana
Anonymous works
Ave rosa speciosa
Regina coeli (addition)
Vidi aquam (addition)
one motet without text

References

Further reading

Music illuminated manuscripts
16th-century illuminated manuscripts
Renaissance music manuscript sources
Renaissance music
Manuscripts of the Vatican Library